The James B. Jameson House, also known as the Jameson-Harsh House, is a historic house in Gallatin, Tennessee, U.S..

The house was built circa 1844 by John Fontville, who also built Oakland in Gallatin and Greenfield in Castalian Springs. The original owner, James B. Jameson, was a farmer who owned 19 slaves in 1860. It was later owned by his granddaughter Eliza, who lived here with her husband, physician Edward Carr. The house remained in the Jameson family until 1920.

The house was designed in the Federal architectural style, with a Greek Revival portico. It has been listed on the National Register of Historic Places since November 25, 1985.

References

Houses on the National Register of Historic Places in Tennessee
Federal architecture in Tennessee
Greek Revival architecture in Tennessee
Houses completed in 1844
Buildings and structures in Sumner County, Tennessee